Private use area may refer to:

ISO/IEC 10646 / Unicode Private Use Areas
ISO 639-3 Private Use Area: qaa to qtz
ISO 15924 Private Use Area: Qaaa to Qabx
ISO 3166-1 alpha-2#User-assigned code elements: AA, QM-QZ, XA-XZ, ZZ
Address space in internet addressing for private networks

See also
 Private (disambiguation)